The 1993 Lipton Championships was a tennis tournament played on Hard courts in Key Biscayne, Florida, United States the event was part of the 1993 ATP Tour and 1993 WTA Tour. The tournament was held from March 12 to 21, 1993.

Finals

Men's singles

 Pete Sampras defeated  MaliVai Washington, 6–3, 6–2.
It was Pete Sampras' 2nd title of the year and his 15th overall. It was his 1st Masters title of the year and his 2nd overall.

Women's singles

 Arantxa Sánchez Vicario defeated  Steffi Graf, 6–4, 3–6, 6–3.
It was Arantxa Sanchez Vicario's 1st title of the year and her 9th overall. It was her 1st Tier I title of the year and her 3rd overall. It was also her second consecutive win at the event after winning in 1992.

Men's doubles

 Richard Krajicek /  Jan Siemerink defeated  Patrick McEnroe /  Jonathan Stark, 6–7, 6–4, 7–6.

Women's doubles

 Jana Novotná /  Larisa Savchenko defeated  Jill Hetherington /  Kathy Rinaldi, 6–2, 7–5.

References

 
Lipton Championships
Lipton Championships
Miami Open (tennis)
Lipton Championships
Lipton International Players Championships
Lipton International Players Championships